The Premio Simpatia (Sympathy Prize) is an annual Italian prize. It has granted since 1971 to those who have distinguished themselves in the social sector, regardless of their sectors of activity.

The awards ceremony takes place at the Capitoline Palace of Rome, which is the reason why the award is also known as Oscar Capitolino.

Among the most renowned winners is the President of the Italian Republic, Sandro Pertini, in 1985.

History 

The prize was designed by Domenico Pertica, but finds its historical origins in Aldo Palazzeschi and Vittorio De Sica. The ceremony is organized by the Comitato Romano Incremento Attività Cittadine (literally: Roman Committee of complementary urban activities). The Oscar Capitolino is symbolized by a bronze rose created by the sculptor Assen Peikov.

In 2001, an Oscar of the Capitol was awarded to the memory of Domenico Pertica, its founder.

Winners 

The list below is not exhaustive and has only the most famous winners:

 1971: Aldo Palazzeschi, Enrico Montesano and Mita Medici
 1972: Alberto Bevilacqua and Federico Fellini
 1973: Giulio Andreotti
 1974: Fausto Papetti and Franco Zeffirelli
 1975: Isabella Biagini
 1976: Anthony Quinn
 1977: Alberto Sordi and Nicoletta Orsomando
 1978: Monica Vitti and Paolo Rossi
 1979: Dario Bellezza
 1980: Pino Calvi
 1981: Leonardo Sciascia
 1986: Elsa Morante (in memoriam)
 1991: Laura Biagiotti
 1997: Igor Man
 1999: Achille Silvestrini
 2000: Piccola Orchestra Avion Travel
 2004: Umberto Guidoni
 2006: Fiorella Mannoia
 2007: Raffaella Carrà and Ezio Mauro
 2010: Ornella Vanoni, Carlo Vanzina and Carlo Verdone
 2011: Achille Bonito Oliva and Nancy Brilli
 2018: Paola Turci and Lewis Eisenberg

References

External links 

  .

Awards established in 1967
1967 establishments in Italy
Italian awards